Indian Springs Village (often simply called Indian Springs) is a rural town in Shelby County, Alabama, United States, in the Birmingham metropolitan area. It incorporated effective November 14, 1990. At the 2010 census the population was 2,363, up from 2,225 in 2000.

An F2 tornado on Palm Sunday, March 27, 1994 damaged business buildings of Indian Springs, in addition to structures in Pelham, Helena, and Inverness. Another tornado struck the town on March 25, 2021, causing EF2 damage to several homes and downing trees throughout several neighborhoods. The tornado eventually reached low-end EF3 strength northeast of town.

Geography
Indian Springs Village is located at  (33.368021, -86.741176).

The private Indian Springs School, for day and boarding students in grades 8-12, is located within the town.

Demographics

At the 2000 census there were 2,225 people, 789 households, and 685 families in the town. The racial makeup of the town was 98.11% White, 0.09% Black or African American, 0.31% Native American, 0.90% Asian, 0.04% Pacific Islander, and 0.54% from two or more races. 0.13% of the population were Hispanic or Latino of any race.
Of the 789 households 38.0% had children under the age of 18 living with them, 80.4% were married couples living together, 4.2% had a female householder with no husband present, and 13.1% were non-families. 11.9% of households were one person and 4.6% were one person aged 65 or older. The average household size was 2.82 and the average family size was 3.05.

The age distribution was 25.7% under the age of 18, 5.3% from 18 to 24, 21.7% from 25 to 44, 34.7% from 45 to 64, and 12.7% 65 or older. The median age was 44 years. For every 100 females, there were 105.1 males. For every 100 females age 18 and over, there were 96.9 males.

The median household income was $92,229 and the median family income  was $96,760. Males had a median income of $66,648 versus $42,222 for females. The per capita income for the town was $37,904. About 0.1% of families and 0.4% of the population were below the poverty line, including none of those under age 18 and 0.4% of those age 65 or over.

2010 census
At the 2010 census there were 2,363 people, 835 households, and 710 families in the town. The racial makeup of the town was 95.7% White, 1.5% Black or African American, 0.2% Native American, 1.9% Asian, 0.0% Pacific Islander, and 0.6% from two or more races. 0.9% of the population were Hispanic or Latino of any race.
Of the 835 households 32.3% had children under the age of 18 living with them, 77.1% were married couples living together, 5.5% had a female householder with no husband present, and 15.0% were non-families. 13.3% of households were one person and 7.3% were one person aged 65 or older. The average household size was 2.79 and the average family size was 3.05.

The age distribution was 24.8% under the age of 18, 6.1% from 18 to 24, 14.6% from 25 to 44, 37.9% from 45 to 64, and 16.5% 65 or older. The median age was 47.4 years. For every 100 females, there were 102.5 males. For every 100 females age 18 and over, there were 96.2 males.

The median household income was $95,921 and the median family income  was $100,600. Males had a median income of $71,917 versus $47,454 for females. The per capita income for the town was $58,467. About 3.1% of families and 2.1% of the population were below the poverty line, including none of those under age 18 and 6.2% of those age 65 or over.

Notable person

Michael McCullers, writer and director of 2008’s hit movie, Baby Mama, former writer with Saturday Night Live and co-writer with Mike Myers of Austin Powers in Goldmember, is an Indian Springs native.

References

External links
 Indian Springs Village Online

Towns in Shelby County, Alabama
Towns in Alabama
Birmingham metropolitan area, Alabama